Seaboard Air Line Railway Depot in Patrick is a historic train station located at Patrick, Chesterfield County, South Carolina. It was built in 1900 by the Seaboard Air Line Railroad, and is a 1 1/2-story frame building with a simple rectangular plan. It has a moderately pitched gable roof with two small, red brick chimneys at its peak. It had served as a flag stop for the Seaboard Air Line's Palmland,

It was listed on the National Register of Historic Places in 1999.

References

Railway stations on the National Register of Historic Places in South Carolina
Railway stations in the United States opened in 1900
Buildings and structures in Chesterfield County, South Carolina
National Register of Historic Places in Chesterfield County, South Carolina
Seaboard Air Line Railroad stations
Former railway stations in South Carolina